Viscount Bertie of Thame, in the County of Oxford, was a title in the Peerage of the United Kingdom. It was created in 1918 for the prominent diplomat Francis Bertie, 1st Baron Bertie of Thame, on his retirement as British Ambassador to France. He had already been created Baron Bertie of Thame, in the County of Oxford, in 1915, also in the Peerage of the United Kingdom. Bertie was the second son of Montagu Bertie, 6th Earl of Abingdon (see Earl of Abingdon for earlier history of the family). Both titles became extinct on the death of his son, the second Viscount, in 1954.

The titles are pronounced barty of tame.

Viscounts Bertie of Thame (1918)
Francis Leveson Bertie, 1st Viscount Bertie of Thame (1844–1919)
Vere Frederick Bertie, 2nd Viscount Bertie of Thame (1878–1954)

Arms

See also
Earl of Abingdon
Earl of Lindsey

References

External links

Extinct viscountcies in the Peerage of the United Kingdom
Bertie of Thame
Noble titles created in 1918